Catherine Palmer is an American Christian novelist. She lives in Atlanta with her husband, Tim, where they serve as missionaries in a refugee community. They have two grown sons. She is a graduate of Southwest Baptist University and holds a master's degree in English from Baylor University. Her first book was published in 1988. Since then, she has published over 50 novels, many of them national best sellers. Catherine has won numerous awards for her writing, including the Christy Award, the highest honor in Christian fiction. In 2004, she was given the Career Achievement Award for Inspirational Romance by Romantic Times magazine. More than two million copies of Catherine's novels are currently in print.

Novels
 "The Prairie Trilogy," comprising Prairie Rose (1997) , Prairie Fire (1998) , and Prairie Storm (1999) .
 Finders Keepers (1999) 
 The Happy Room  (2002) 
 A Dangerous Silence (2001) 
 Fatal Harvest (2003)

References

20th-century American novelists
21st-century American novelists
20th-century American women writers
21st-century American women writers
American women novelists
Christian writers
Living people
Year of birth missing (living people)